The 1994 Kansas City Chiefs season was the franchise's 25th season in the National Football League, the 32nd as the Kansas City Chiefs and the 35th overall. They failed to improve their 11–5 record from 1993 and finishing with a 9–7 record and Wild Card spot in the 1994–95 playoffs. The Chiefs lost to the Miami Dolphins 27–17 in the Wild Card round. Alongside celebrating the NFL's 75th anniversary season, Hall of Fame quarterback Joe Montana retired following the season.

By playing their first four games vs. the NFC West, the Chiefs became the first AFC team to play its first four games against NFC teams since the AFL–NFL merger. The first team to play four inter-conference games to open a season were the 1992 Los Angeles Rams.

1994 was the first season that the playing surface at Arrowhead Stadium was natural grass.  It had previously been TartanTurf from 1972-1993.

Offseason

NFL draft

Personnel

Staff

Roster

Season summary
After an opening day win over the New Orleans Saints, the Chiefs faced the San Francisco 49ers on September 11. Facing his old team, Joe Montana led the Chiefs to a 24–17 win at Arrowhead. But after opening the season at 3–0, the Chiefs dropped 2 in a row to the Rams and Chargers.

On October 17, a 6-yard pass and a tightrope run into the end zone ended the Chiefs' 11-year drought in Mile High Stadium. Joe Montana and the Chiefs faced a 4-point deficit on Monday Night Football.  The final drive in the final 82 seconds took nine plays, all of them Montana passes except one run of 10 yards by Marcus Allen; Montana's final pass was a five-yard score to Willie Davis for the 31–28 Kansas City win.  For the game, Montana hit 34 of 54 pass attempts for 393 yards and 3 touchdowns and the Chiefs, now 4–2, had now thrust themselves back into the playoff hunt.  The game was tied 14–14 at the half. Lin Elliott's field goal with 4:08 left in the game temporarily put the Chiefs ahead 24–21. A Marcus Allen fumble set up the Broncos' final touchdown, but Montana and his inspiring confidence resulted in the comeback.

Montana would have another great season, passing for 3,283 yards.   The rushing game improved from 1993 as the Chiefs rushed for 1,732 yards and twelve touchdowns (up from the previous year's 1,655 yards).  Allen's game trailed off from 1993 as he gained 709 yards to lead the team (to 764 the previous year), while rookie Greg Hill managed only 574 yards for the season. Fullback Kimble Anders was the leading receiver with 67 receptions. The defense showed flashes of brilliance as it improved to seventh in fewest points allowed from 1993's ninth, and as had become the standard, was led by perennial Pro Bowlers Derrick Thomas and Neil Smith. Defensive back Dale Carter had  a superb year and was also chosen for the Pro Bowl.

On December 24, Marcus Allen gained 132 yards rushing as the Chiefs beat the Los Angeles Raiders 19–9 in the last Raider's game ever as host in Los Angeles. The win secured a fifth-straight playoff spot for the Chiefs.

Preseason

Regular season

Schedule

Note: Intra-division opponents are in bold text.

Game summaries

Week 1: at New Orleans Saints

Week 2: vs. San Francisco 49ers

Week 3: at Atlanta Falcons

Week 4: vs. Los Angeles Rams

Week 6: at San Diego Chargers

Week 7: at Denver Broncos

Week 8: vs. Seattle Seahawks

Week 9: at Buffalo Bills

Week 10: vs. Los Angeles Raiders

Week 11: vs. San Diego Chargers

Week 12: vs. Cleveland Browns

Week 13: at Seattle Seahawks

Week 14: vs. Denver Broncos

Week 15: at Miami Dolphins

Week 16: vs. Houston Oilers

Week 17: at Los Angeles Raiders

Postseason

Schedule

Game summaries

AFC Wild Card Playoffs: at (3) Miami Dolphins

Standings

 Kansas City finished ahead of the Los Angeles Raiders based on head-to-head sweep (2–0)

References

Kansas City Chiefs
Kansas City Chiefs seasons
Kansas